Sodium hydrogenoxalate is salt (ionic compound) of formula , consisting of sodium cations  and hydrogenoxalate anions  or . The anion can be described as the result of removing one hydrogen ion  from oxalic acid , or adding one to the oxalate anion .

Properties

Hydrates
The compound is commonly encountered as the anhydrous form or as the monohydrate ·. Both are colorless crystalline solids at ambient temperature.

The monohydrate can be obtained by evaporating a solution of the compound at room temperature.

The crystal structure of NaHC2O4·H2O is triclinic normal (pinacoidal, space group P). The lattice parameters are a = 650.3 pm, b = 667.3 pm, c = 569.8 pm, α = 85.04°, β = 110.00°, γ = 105.02°, and Z = 2. The hydrogen oxalate ions are linked end to end in infinite chains by hydrogen bonds (257.1 pm). The chains are cross linked to form layers by both O–H···O bonds from the water molecules (280.8 pm, 282.6 pm) and by ionic bonds Na+···O. These layers are in turn held together by Na+···O bonds. The oxalate group is non-planar with an angle of twist about the C–C bond of 12.9°.

Reactions
Upon being heated, sodium hydrogenoxalate converts to oxalic acid and sodium oxalate, the latter of which decomposes into sodium carbonate and carbon monoxide.

2 →  + 

 →  +

Toxicity
The health hazards posed by this compound are largely due to its acidity and to the toxic effects of oxalic acid and other oxalate or hydrogenoxalate salts, which can follow ingestion or absorption through the skin. The toxic effects include necrosis of tissues due to sequestration of calcium ions, and the formation of poorly soluble calcium oxalate stones in the kidneys that can obstruct the kidney tubules.

References

Organic sodium salts
Oxalates